Campellolebias is a genus of killifish in the family Rivulidae from southeast Brazil. They are restricted to seasonal blackwater pools in forests in coastal parts of Santa Catarina and São Paulo states.

Uniquely among killifish, Campellolebias and the closely related Cynopoecilus have internal fertilization. A part of the males' anal fin forms a "pseudo-gonopodium" that is used for inseminating the female.

Species
There are currently four recognized species in this genus:

 Campellolebias brucei Vaz Ferreira & Sierra de Soriano, 1974 (Swordfin killifish)
 Campellolebias chrysolineatus W. J. E. M. Costa, Lacerda & G. C. Brasil, 1989
 Campellolebias dorsimaculatus W. J. E. M. Costa, Lacerda & G. C. Brasil, 1989
 Campellolebias intermedius W. J. E. M. Costa & De Luca, 2006

Etymology
The generic name Campellolebias is a combination of Campello, which honours the Brazilian chemical engineer, aquarist and amateur ichthyologist Gilberto Campello Brasil (1945-2008) and lebias a Greek word for a small fish which was applied to Killifish by Georges Cuvier and is now used a  root for names within the order Cyprinodontiformes. Vaz Ferreira & Sierra de Soriano described Campello Brasil as an  “enthusiastic scholar” of Brazilian killifishes and he also collected specimens, sending them to the Vaz Ferreira & Sierra de Soriano.

References 

Rivulidae
Freshwater fish genera
Taxonomy articles created by Polbot